Nicholas Cullinan (born 1977) is an art historian and curator. On 6 January 2015 it was announced that he would be the 12th director of the National Portrait Gallery in London, a post he took up in the spring.

Cullinan was born in Connecticut and raised in Yorkshire. He received his BA, MA and PhD in art history from the Courtauld Institute of Art in London. In 2001–3, while a student, he worked as a visitor services assistant at the National Portrait Gallery, where he is now director. In 2006–7 he held the Hilla Rebay International Fellowship at the Guggenheim museums in Bilbao, New York and Venice. From 2007 to 2013 he was curator of international modern art at Tate Modern. He then joined the Metropolitan Museum of Art in New York City as its curator of modern and contemporary art. In 2014 he co-curated an exhibition of Henri Matisse's cut-outs at Tate Modern with Sir Nicholas Serota. The exhibition as of yet is the most successful in the gallery's history, attracting more than 500,000 visitors.

References

1977 births
People from Connecticut
Alumni of the Courtauld Institute of Art
People associated with the Tate galleries
People associated with the Metropolitan Museum of Art
Directors of the National Portrait Gallery, London
Living people